The Family Secret (Swedish: Familjens hemlighe) is a 1936 Swedish comedy film directed by Gustaf Molander and starring Olof Winnerstrand, Karin Swanström and Erik 'Bullen' Berglund. It is based on the 1903 French play The Secret of Polichinelle by Pierre Wolff, and a French adaptation was also produced the same year. The film premiered in Gothenburg in December 1936.

The film's sets were designed by the art director Arne Åkermark.

Synopsis
A middle class family, planning an arranged marriage for their adult son with a wealthy heiress, are shocked to discover that he is already engaged and has a small child with his fiancee.

Cast
 Olof Winnerstrand as Arvid Ekman
 Karin Swanström as Lillie Ekman
 Erik 'Bullen' Berglund as John Hessler 
 Birgit Tengroth as Margit Berg
 Kotti Chave as Arne Ekman
 Hjördis Petterson as Ellen Winkler 
 Gösta Bernhard as Olle
 Wiktor Andersson as Orderly
 Ingrid Borthen as Marianne Winkler, Ellen's daughter 
 John Botvid as First mate 
 Greta Ericson as Gullan, Margit's friend at work 
 Jullan Jonsson as Emma, Hessler's housemaid 
 Ka Nerell as 	Greta, child nurse 
 Ruth Weijden as Maria, Ekman's housemaid

References

Bibliography 
 Per Olov Qvist & Peter von Bagh. Guide to the Cinema of Sweden and Finland. Greenwood Publishing Group, 2000.

External links 
 

1936 films
Swedish comedy films
1936 comedy films
1930s Swedish-language films
Films directed by Gustaf Molander
Remakes of French films
Swedish films based on plays
Swedish black-and-white films
1930s Swedish films